Horizon (Persian: Ofogh) is a 1989 film by the Iranian director Rasool Mollagholipoor. Mollagholipoor also scripted the film. Set during the Iran-Iraq war, Horizon is an example of Sacred Defence cinema. It starred among others Jahanbakhsh Soltani, Ali Sajjadi Hosseini and Mehrzad Nooshiravan.

Cast

References

External links 
 

Iranian war films
Iran–Iraq War films
1989 films